Colonne may refer to:

 Colonne, a commune in eastern France
 Concerts Colonne, a French symphony orchestra
 Édouard Colonne, a French conductor and violinist
 Cap Colonne, a cape in southern Italy